Four Door Lemon Ltd was a video games company based in Bradford, West Yorkshire and was one of the UK's longest-lived independent video games and middleware developers. Commonly known as "FDL", the company’s name derived from a children’s joke.

History 
The company was founded in 2005 by programmers Simon Barratt and Tim Wharton. After developing and launching the Lemon Engine as a middleware program, the team expanded and began development on games for various publishers alongside continued development on the Lemon Engine.

The team continued to expand as the company developing games for many publishers as well as the development and launch of its own titles. The company was dissolved in September 2018.

Company philosophy 
After years of focusing on middleware and game developments, Four Door Lemon started to develop games to be self-published on various platforms, alongside work-for-hire titles for other publishers.

Technology 
Four Door Lemon utilized its own technology for developments. The multi-platform Lemon Engine has been used in all FDL-developed titles, with a version now being used for the PS4 and Xbox One developments.

Games 
101 Ways To Die (PC) published by 4 Door Lemon Vision 1
Foul Play (PS4/PS Vita) published by Mastertronic/Mediatonic
Joe Danger Infinity (PS Vita) published by Hello Games
Joe Danger Touch (Android) published by Hello Games
Table Mini Golf (PS Vita) published by SCEE
Table Football (PS Vita) published by SCEE 
Table Ice Hockey (PS Vita) published by SCEE 
Oddworld: Munch’s Oddysee HD (PS3/PS Vita) published by Oddworld Inhabitants
New Star Soccer 1.5 (iOS/Android) published by NewStarGames
Football Director (NDS) published by Sports Director
The Lighthouse HD (iOS) published by Kavcom Ltd
You are the Ref (iOS/Android/PlayStation Mobile) self-published
You are the Umpire (iOS/Android/PlayStation Mobile) self-published
Cricket Captain 2010 (iOS) published by Myinteractive
Premier Manager (PS2/PC) licensed technology published by Focus Multimedia
Puzzler Collection (NDS/PS2/PSP/Wii/PC) published by Ubisoft
Little Britain: The Video Game (PS2) published by Mastertronic
Tic Toc Body Pop (iOS) self-published
Quizquizquiz (iOS/Android/PlayStation Mobile/Kindle) self-published
Aurifi (iOS) published by Punk Pie Ltd
Busy Bees (PC touch screen) developed for the Eureka National Children’s Museum

Industry organizations 
Four Door Lemon was a member of numerous video games related bodies, including UKIE (board member), Game Republic, TIGA, Made in creative UK and Ga-Ma-Yo.

References

External links 
 Official Four Door Lemon website archive

Defunct video game companies of the United Kingdom
Video game development companies
Companies based in Bradford
Video game companies established in 2005
2005 establishments in England